Pallassena or Pallassana is a village and gram panchayat in the Palakkad District, state of Kerala, India. It is close to Kollengode Town and Koduvayur and  beside the river Gayatri, one of the tributaries of Bharatapuza. It is primarily notable for being the location of the Meenkulathi Temple.

Demographics
 India census, Pallassena had a population of 23,158 with 11,303 males and 11,855 females.

Onathallu Ritual
Onathallu or Avittathallu is a festival celebrated by the natives of Pallassana Desham in the Chittur Thaluk in Palakkad district, in the southernmost state of India, Kerala. 
The festival is a tradition followed by the natives of the region in commemoration of the numerous wars they led and fought as part of the army of the Kolathiris. The name Pallassana refers to the fact that the group historically constituted the Pallava Sena or the Pallava Army, which eventually morphed into Pallassana or Pallasena, as it is known today.
The tradition involves an enactment or warlike performances by men of the Nair community at the Vettakaruman Dewaswom temple premises. and obc community perform in thallumannam. The key component of the performance involves men pairing up and, under the guidance and supervision of elders in the community, enacting physical combat, war cries and battle-like behaviour. This is seen as a vazhivaadu by the men involved, and is a highly revered and attended festival during the Avittam nakshatra of Onam in puthankavu and thiruvonam nakshatra of onam in thallumannam.

References

Villages in Palakkad district
Gram panchayats in Palakkad district